Berkleasmium is a genus of fungi belonging to the family Dematiaceae.

The genus name of Berkleasmium is in honour of 2 people (Berkley and Lea), Miles Joseph Berkeley (1803 - 1889), an English cryptogamist and clergyman, and one of the founders of the science of plant pathology and also Thomas Gibson Lea (1785–1844), who was an American botanist.

The genus was circumscribed by Johann Baptista Zobel in  Icon. (Corda) vol.6 n page 4 in 1854.

Species
 Berkleasmium crunisia
 Berkleasmium micronesicum
 Berkleasmium nigroapicale
 Berkleasmium phyllostachydis
 Berkleasmium sp. BCC 17003
 Berkleasmium sp. BCC 17023
 Berkleasmium sp. BCC 17024
 Berkleasmium sp. Dzf12
 Berkleasmium typhae

References

Hypocreales genera